Earle Connor (born July 30, 1976) is a Canadian Paralympic amputee sprinter. Connor holds several athletics world records in the class of T42, or above-knee, amputee.

Biography

Early life 
Earle Connor was born July 30, 1976 in Castlegar, British Columbia to Dave and Diane Connor. Because he was born without a left fibula, his left leg was amputated above-the-knee when he was 3 months old. At the age of 9 months Earle was fitted with his first prosthetic leg.

Growing up in rural Saskatchewan, Connor played all available sports, excelling at hockey, tennis and baseball, and graduated from Rosthern Junior College. Connor was the first amputee ever drafted into the Canadian Junior Hockey system as a goaltender.

Paralympic career 
Connor was inspired by watching television coverage of the 1996 Summer Paralympics to become an amputee sprinter with the goal of competing at the 2000 Summer Paralympics. At the 2000 Paralympics in Sydney, he took gold in the 100-metre final, but finished second in the 200 metres when a misstep on the first corner cost him a few seconds.

He returned to the Paralympics in 2008, winning gold in the men's T42 100 m sprint and setting a new Paralympic record time of 12.32 seconds.

Performance Enhancing Drug Suspensions 

In 2004 he had tested positive for nandrolone and testosterone and received a two-year ban, which caused him to miss the 2004 Paralympic Games. The resulting sanction was decreased from 4 years to 2 years due to the positive test being attributed to his physician prescribed medication.

In 2015 he tested positive for testosterone for a second time in his career despite the fact he had previously submitted his retirement papers , resulting in a ban from competition for four years by the Canadian Centre for Ethics in Sport.

Awards 
1997: Canadian Disabled Athlete of the Year (also won in 1998 and 1999)
2000:  *rescinded following positive drug tests
2004:  *rescinded following positive drug tests

References

External links 
Canadian Paralympic Committee – Profiles – Earle Connor
Earle Connor – Team Ossur
Earle 
1976 births
Living people
Athletes (track and field) at the 2000 Summer Paralympics
Athletes (track and field) at the 2008 Summer Paralympics
Canadian amputees
Laureus World Sports Awards winners
Paralympic track and field athletes of Canada
Paralympic gold medalists for Canada
Paralympic silver medalists for Canada
Sportspeople from Castlegar, British Columbia
Canadian male sprinters
World record holders in Paralympic athletics
Medalists at the 2000 Summer Paralympics
Medalists at the 2008 Summer Paralympics 
Paralympic medalists in athletics (track and field)
Sprinters with limb difference
Paralympic sprinters

Connor – Criminal